The Chicago Lake Shore and South Bend Railway formed in 1901, is the earliest predecessor of the Chicago South Shore and South Bend Railroad (and South Shore Line).

History

At its formation on November 30, 1901, the corporate title was the Chicago & Indiana Air Line Railway (Air Line).  The Air Line was controlled by Frank and James Seagrave, brothers from Toledo, Ohio, who had envisioned an electrically operated freight and passenger railroad from Toledo to Chicago, Illinois.  The Seagrave brothers had completed their Toledo and Western Railroad mainline across the former Great Black Swamp from Toledo to Pioneer, Ohio, in an area that otherwise had no direct rail service to Toledo.  A branch was constructed from Sylvania, Ohio, to Adrian, Michigan.  The Seagraves’ anticipated that they would build west to Goshen, Indiana, where they would obtain trackage rights from the Indiana Electric Railroad Company (later the Chicago, South Bend and Northern Indiana; successor company to the first commercial electric trolley line in North America) to South Bend where it would connect with the Air Line for Chicago.

Financing to complete the railroad was announced on January 17, 1903.  Property acquisition and engineering from South Bend west to the St. Joseph – LaPorte county line was completed within the year.  The Seagraves’ also obtained franchises for operation in the streets of South Bend, New Carlisle, and Michigan City.  The Seagraves’ began street railway operations at East Chicago during September, 1903.  Grading for the railroad was begun in St. Joseph County during 1903, but the Rich Man's Panic put an end to the work and apparently the Seagraves’ interest in the company.

The historical significance of the Seagraves’ effort in developing what would become the South Shore Line was that in 1903 there was no business model for a short line regional high-speed electrified railroad handling freight and passengers.  Economic historians George Hilton and John Due noted in their history of the interurbans that the Seagraves’ effort was probably the first.   But for the Panic of 1903, the Seagraves’ would have likely completed what is recognized today as a regional high-speed electrified railroad from Toledo to Chicago.

The directors of the Air Line voted for a corporate name change on July 30, 1904: The Chicago, Lake Shore and South Bend Railway Company (South Shore Lines).  In 1907, with the easing of monetary pressures, property acquisition, engineering, and construction began again under the direction of a new promoter, James B. Hanna.  Although the scope of the project was then limited to a rail line from Chicago to South Bend, the business model posited by the Seagraves’ remained.

The first phase of construction from South Bend to Michigan City was completed and in scheduled service on July 1, 1908.  The remainder of the line from Michigan City to Hammond was in service on September 6, 1908, only twenty-one days before the first Ford Model T automobile left the Piquette Avenue Plant in Detroit.  Not only was the South Shore Lines embroiled in a transportation war with the automobile, but it was also unwittingly embroiled in the War of the Currents waged by Thomas Edison and George Westinghouse.  Edison famously clung to his original direct current system, while Westinghouse embraced the alternating current system developed by Nikola Tesla.  The South Shore Lines unwisely chose the Westinghouse Electric Corporation system.

Some twenty other interurbans adopted the Westinghouse system, most between 1904 and 1908.  The alternating current system was not perfected however, and nearly all the lines operating with it were quickly converted to direct current, some in as little as three years.  The South Shore Lines never found itself in a financial position to convert to direct current despite the high expense of maintaining the alternating current system.

The South Shore Lines found itself in financial difficulty from the start as passenger revenues were insufficient to cover the railway's bonded indebtedness.  This was exacerbated by claims resulting from two head-on wrecks in 1909 that resulted in an unfunded legislative mandate to install a costly block signal system.  Despite these setbacks, service had been extended to Pullman on Chicago's South Side on April 4, 1909.  An agreement with the Illinois Central Railroad dated May 25, 1912, called for non-motorized trail coaches to be attached to trains originating in Gary to be hauled by steam locomotives for the run to Randolph Street near Chicago's Loop.

Attempting to overcome inadequate earnings, the South Shore Lines made every effort to develop freight service in 1916, and an excursion business to bring Chicagoans to the Indiana Dunes, the amusement park at Michigan City, and the Casino at Hudson Lake.  The most significant of the rail excursions to the development of Northwest Indiana were the regular outings of the Prairie Club of Chicago on the South Shore Lines that began in 1909.  The access to the Dunes that the South Shore Lines provided to the Prairie Club led the members to erect cabins in the Dunes.  With assistance from Stephen Mather, the first director of the National Park Service, The Prairie Club soon waged a lobbying campaign for the creation of a Sand Dunes National Park that for a time was unsuccessful, but did culminate in the opening of the Indiana Dunes State Park in 1925.  Congressional authorization of a National Park Service unit in the Dunes in 1966 resulted in the Indiana Dunes National Lakeshore (now Indiana Dunes National Park).

In 1925, the Cleveland Trust Company still held the original construction bonds of the South Shore Lines in the amount of $9,500,000.  Earlier, in 1924, Samuel Insull, a utilities developer who had electric and gas utility investments throughout much of the United States sought a means of developing a new customer base with a balanced electrical load in the Indiana Dunes country.  After investigating both the South Shore Lines and the Chicago, South Bend and Northern Indiana, Insull had the South Shore Lines appraised.  Based upon the depreciated appraised value of $6,463,076, and with a commitment to invest $2,500,000 in the property, Insull purchased the original construction debt from Cleveland Trust in exchange for 6% noncumulative debentures.  Insull controlled a 60% majority stock interest in the new company.  The closing of the transaction took place on June 29, 1925, six days after Insull formed the South Shore Line.

Preserved Equipment

One wooden passenger car has survived from the South Shore Lines.  Combination coach-baggage car #73 was built by the Niles Car and Manufacturing Company in 1908.  #73 is currently undergoing restoration.

References

Railway lines in Chicago
South Shore Line